Diane Williams may refer to:

Diane Williams (author) (born 1946), American author,
Diane Williams (athlete) (born 1960), American sprinter
Diane R. Williams (1947–2016), African-American lawyer known for Williams v. Saxbe
Diane Wray Williams (born 1938), American politician, businesswoman, and teacher